Nematocampa baggettaria, or Baggett's spanworm moth, is a moth of the family Geometridae. It is found in Florida, Georgia, Louisiana and North Carolina.

The length of the forewings is 7–8 mm for males and 7–9 mm for females. The wings are orange brown, with dark, purplish-brown shading in most of the outer third in females. Adults are on wing from April to September.

Etymology
The species is named for H. D. (Dave) Baggett of Palatka, Florida, who first brought it to the attention of the author and who collected about half of the specimens seen at the time.

References

Moths described in 1993
Ourapterygini